Events in the year 2018 in the Principality of Andorra.

Incumbents 

 Co-Princes: Emmanuel Macron and Joan Enric Vives Sicília
 Prime Minister: Antoni Martí

Events

References 

 
2010s in Andorra
Years of the 21st century in Andorra
Andorra
Andorra